Topiram was a railway station on the Strzelecki line in South Gippsland, Victoria, Australia. The station was opened on 29 June 1922, and was closed on 7 August 1941 following flooding of the Lang Lang River, which resulted in damage to one of the four trestle bridges over the river, after which the line was closed back to Yannathan station.

Station facilities
Upon opening of the line in 1922 Topiram station was supplied with cattle and sheep yards, goods loading and storage facilities, and passenger facilities.

Disused railway stations in Victoria (Australia)
Shire of Baw Baw